Acraea guluensis is a butterfly in the family Nymphalidae. It is found in northern Uganda and southern Sudan.

Taxonomy
Acraea guluensis is a member of the Acraea acrita species group. The clade members are:

Acraea guluensis
Acraea acrita
Acraea chaeribula
Acraea eltringhamiana
Acraea lualabae
Acraea manca
Acraea pudorina 
Acraea utengulensis

Classification of Acraea by Henning, Henning & Williams, Pierre. J. & Bernaud

Acraea (group acrita) Henning, 1993 
Acraea (Rubraea) Henning & Williams, 2010 
Acraea (Acraea) (supraspecies acrita) Pierre & Bernaud, 2013 
Acraea (Acraea)  Groupe egina Pierre & Bernaud, 2014

References

Le Doux, C., 1932 Neue Acraeinae (Lepid. Rhopal.) aus Afrika. Mitteilungen der Deutschen Entomologischen Gesellschaft 3:4-7.

External links

Acraea guluensis Le Site des Acraea de Dominique Bernaud
Acraea guluensis Dominique Bernaud fiche
Images representing  Acraea guluensis at Bold

Butterflies described in 1932
guluensis